Mint To Be (Mint To Be – ) is a 2018 Thai television series starring Perawat Sangpotirat (Krist) and Worranit Thawornwong (Mook).

Directed by Kanittha Kwunyoo and produced by GMMTV together with Baa-Ram-Ewe, the series was one of the ten television series for 2018 showcased by GMMTV in their "Series X" event on 1 February 2018. It premiered on GMM 25 and LINE TV on 29 July 2018, airing on Sundays at 20:30 ICT and 22:30 ICT, respectively. The series concluded on 30 September 2018.

Cast and characters 
Below are the cast of the series:

Main 
 Perawat Sangpotirat (Krist) as Mint
 Worranit Thawornwong (Mook) as Bebe

Supporting 
 Nawat Phumphotingam (White) as Bo
 Nara Thepnupa as Bambam
 Jirakit Kuariyakul (Toptap) as Wave
 Maripha Siripool (Wawa) as Nook
 Weerayut Chansook (Arm) as Oat
 Supranee Jayrinpon (Kai) as Mai
 Tatchakorn Boonlapayanan (Godji) as Jelly
 Suchada Poonpattanasuk (Hoom) as Boom
 Duangjai Hathaikarn as Grandma Buathong
 Praeploy Oree as Oeae
 Sarunthorn Klaiudom (Mean) as Tubtim

Soundtracks

References

External links 
 Mint To Be on LINE TV
 
 GMMTV

Television series by GMMTV
Thai romantic comedy television series
Thai drama television series
2018 Thai television series debuts
2018 Thai television series endings
GMM 25 original programming
Television series by Baa-Ram-Ewe